The 2008 Illinois Republican presidential primary was held on February 5, 2008. Illinois was one of 24 States holding a primary or caucus on Super Tuesday, 2008. Delegates from each of Illinois' 19 congressional districts are selected by direct election. In addition, the primary ballot also contains a preference poll that lists the presidential candidates. 10 at-large delegates and 3 party leader delegates were elected at the State Convention and officially went to the Republican Convention unpledged.

Results

*Candidate withdrew prior to the primary

See also
 2008 Illinois Democratic presidential primary
 2008 United States presidential election in Illinois
 2008 Republican Party presidential primaries

References

Illinois
Republican primary
2008 Super Tuesday
Illinois Republican primaries